The 2014 Ricoh Women's British Open was played 10–13 July at the Royal Birkdale Golf Club in Southport, England. It was the 38th Women's British Open, and the 14th as a major championship on the LPGA Tour. It was the sixth Women's British Open at Royal Birkdale, the most recent was four years earlier in 2010. ESPN and BBC Sport televised the event from Royal Birkdale.

Mo Martin won her first major, one shot ahead of runners-up Shanshan Feng and Suzann Pettersen. Martin led after 36 holes at 138 (−6) after consecutive rounds of 69, but fell three shots back with a 77 (+5) on Saturday, tied with six others for seventh place.  An hour ahead of the final pair on a clear and breezy Sunday, she shot even par, capped by an eagle at the final hole. Her second shot from the fairway on the par 5 nearly holed out for an albatross (double eagle); it rolled onto the green and struck the flagstick, stopping six feet (1.8 m) away. She sank the putt and waited for the others to finish, preparing for a potential playoff. It was Martin's first win on the LPGA Tour, and moved her from 99 to 26 in the women's world rankings.

Field
The field for the tournament was set at 144, and most earned exemptions based on past performance on the Ladies European Tour, the LPGA Tour, previous major championships, or with a high ranking in the Women's World Golf Rankings. The rest of the field earned entry by successfully competing in qualifying tournaments open to any female golfer, professional or amateur, with a low handicap.

There were 16 exemption categories for the 2014 Women's British Open.

The top 15 finishers (and ties) from the 2013 Women's British Open.
Na Yeon Choi (10), Paula Creamer (7,10), Mamiko Higa, Meena Lee, Stacy Lewis (7,9,10), Pernilla Lindberg, Catriona Matthew (9), Anna Nordqvist (7,10), Hee Young Park, Suzann Pettersen (8), Morgan Pressel, Miki Saiki
Nicole Castrale, Natalie Gulbis, and Lizette Salas (7) did not play
The top 10 Ladies European Tour members in the Women's World Golf Rankings not already exempt under category 1.
Jodi Ewart Shadoff, Shanshan Feng (10), Sandra Gal, Caroline Hedwall, Charley Hull (7), Karine Icher, Ariya Jutanugarn, Ai Miyazato, Azahara Muñoz, Beatriz Recari
The top 30 LPGA Tour members in the Women's World Golf Rankings not already exempt under category 1.
Chella Choi, Carlota Ciganda, Haeji Kang, Cristie Kerr (10), Christina Kim, I.K. Kim (7), Lydia Ko (7), Jessica Korda (7), Ilhee Lee, Brittany Lincicome, Mika Miyazato, Se Ri Pak, Inbee Park (7,8,10), Pornanong Phatlum, Gerina Piller, So Yeon Ryu (10), Jenny Shin, Angela Stanford, Lexi Thompson (7,10), Yani Tseng (9,10), Karrie Webb (7), Michelle Wie (7,10), Amy Yang
The top 25 on the current LET money list not already exempt under category 1 or 2.
Beth Allen, Maria Balikoeva, Stacy Lee Bregman, Hannah Burke, Nikki Campbell, Holly Clyburn, Laura Davies, Valentine Derrey (7), Sophie Giquel-Bettan, Trish Johnson, Malene Jørgensen, Sarah Kemp, Vikki Laing, Camilla Lennarth, Amelia Lewis, Diana Luna, Gwladys Nocera, Lee-Anne Pace, Titiya Plucksataporn, Marion Ricordeau, Klára Spilková, Kylie Walker (7), Sophie Walker, Linda Wessberg, Cheyenne Woods (7)
The top 40 on the current LPGA Tour money list not already exempt under category 1 or 3.
Amy Anderson, Christel Boeljon, Katie Burnett, Dori Carter, Paz Echeverria, Austin Ernst, Julieta Granada, Mina Harigae, Eun-Hee Ji, Tiffany Joh, Danielle Kang, Kim Kaufman, P.K. Kongkraphan, Candie Kung, Brittany Lang, Mi Hyang Lee (7), Mirim Lee, Mo Martin, Caroline Masson, Belen Mozo, Haru Nomura, Brooke Pancake, Dewi Claire Schreefel, Giulia Sergas, Sarah Jane Smith, Thidapa Suwannapura, Ayako Uehara, Mariajo Uribe, Line Vedel, Alison Walshe, Sun-Young Yoo (10)
The top five on the current LPGA of Japan Tour (JLPGA) money list not already exempt under category 1, 2, 3 or 11.
Ahn Sun-ju, Haruna Erina Hara, Misuzu Narita, Onnarin Sattayabanphot, Ayaka Watanabe
Winners of any recognised LET or LPGA Tour events in the calendar year 2014.
Florentyna Parker
Winners of the 2013 LET, LPGA, JLPGA and KLPGA money lists.
Rikako Morita
Winners of the last 10 editions of the Women's British Open.
Jeong Jang, Jiyai Shin, Sherri Steinhauer, Karen Stupples
Lorena Ochoa did not play
Winners of the last five editions of the U.S. Women's Open, Kraft Nabisco Championship, and LPGA Championship.
Winner of the 2013 Japan LPGA Tour Championship Ricoh Cup.
Shiho Oyama
The leading five LPGA Tour members upon completion of 36 holes in the 2014 Manulife Financial LPGA Classic who have entered the Championship and who are not otherwise exempt.
Marina Alex, Jacqu Concolino, Jee Young Lee, Xi Yu Lin, Kristy McPherson
The leading three LET members in the 2014 ISPS Handa Ladies European Masters, who have entered the Championship and who are not otherwise exempt.
Amy Boulden (a), Hannah Jun Medlock, Sally Watson
The 2014 British Ladies Amateur champion, 2013 U.S. Women's Amateur champion, 2013 International European Ladies Amateur Championship champion, winner or next available player in the 2013 LGU Order of Merit, and the Mark H. McCormack Medal holder provided they are still amateurs at the time of the Championship and a maximum of two other leading amateurs at the discretion of the Ladies' Golf Union.
Georgia Hall, Emily Kristine Pedersen, Emma Talley
Lydia Ko, Mark H. McCormack Medal winner, turned pro in October 2013 forfeiting this exemption. She later qualified in categories 3 and 7.
Any players granted special exemptions from qualifying by the Championship Committee.
Minjee Lee (a)
Balance of the 90 LPGA Tour members
Joanna Klatten, Ji Young Oh, Alena Sharp, Ashleigh Simon

Qualifiers:
Holly Aitchison, Bree Arthur, Laetitia Beck, Becky Brewerton, Cathryn Bristow, Katie Futcher, Stacey Keating, Louise Larsson, Stephanie Meadow, Stephanie Na, Su-Hyun Oh (a), Marianne Skarpnord, Nontaya Srisawang, Lauren Taylor, Liz Young
Lucy Williams replaced Lizette Salas

Nationalities in the field

Past champions in the field

Made the cut

Missed the cut

Course

Source:

Previous lengths of the course for the Women's British Open (since 2001):
 2010: , par 72
 2005: , par 72

Round summaries

First round
Thursday, 10 July 2014

Second round
Friday, 11 July 2014

Third round
Saturday, 12 July 2014

Final round
Sunday, 13 July 2014	

Source:

Amateurs: Talley (+6), Hall (+9).

Scorecard
Final round

Cumulative tournament scores, relative to par

Source:

References

External links

LPGA.com - Women's British Open - microsite
Ladies European Tour: Women's British Open
Ladies' Golf Union: Women's British Open 

Women's British Open
Golf tournaments in England
British Open
Women's British Open
Women's British Open
2010s in Merseyside
Sport in Southport